Isotenes inae is a moth of the family Tortricidae first described by Alexey Diakonoff in 1948. It is found in Nepal, India, Thailand, Vietnam, Taiwan and Indonesia (Sumatra, Java, Sulawesi and Seram). The habitat consists of lower and upper montane forests.

References

Moths described in 1948
Archipini